Bergen Sporvei AS was a municipal owned public transport company that operated in Bergen, Norway from 1898 to 1998. The company operated both the Bergen Tramway, Bergen trolleybus and the yellow buses in Bergen.

History
The company was founded as Bergen Elektriske Sporvei in 1898 to operate the tramway that was built in Bergen. After the municipality nationalized the tramway it changed name to Bergen Sporvei. Eventually the company also started operating buses. Both the trams and buses where yellow. In 1965 the tramway was closed and replaced with trolleybuses, also operated by Bergen Sporvei. As a consequence of the municipal merger in Bergen in 1972, Laksevåg Kommunale Rutebilselskap was merged into Bergen Sporvei. After the municipal merger there were a number of bus companies in Bergen, and Bergen Sporvei only retained route permissions within the old municipal borders was well as Laksevåg. In 1998, Pan Trafikk, operating the red suburban buses was merged with Bergen Sporvei, creating the new company Gaia Trafikk.

Defunct bus companies of Norway
Bus companies of Vestland
Trolleybus transport in Norway
Bergen Tramway
Companies based in Bergen
Transport companies established in 1898
Transport companies disestablished in 1998
1898 establishments in Norway
1999 disestablishments in Norway
Tramway companies of Norway